Gasteruption jaculator is a species of the family Gasteruptiidae, subfamily Gasteruptiinae.

Distribution 
This species is mainly present in Austria, Belgium, Great Britain, Czech Republic, Finland, France, Germany, Greece, Hungary, Italy, Poland, Romania, Russia, Slovakia, Spain, Sweden, Switzerland, in the eastern Palearctic realm, and in the Near East.

Description 
The head and thorax are completely black. The head is strongly rounded, the thorax is elongated in a sort of long neck (propleura), which separates the head from the body. Also the abdomen is strongly stretched, broader at the posterior end and placed on the upper chest (propodeum). The colour of the abdomen is black, with reddish-orange rings. The tibiae of the hind legs are club shaped. In the female the ovipositor is usually very long with a white tip. In resting position, these wasps slowly and rhythmically raise and lower the abdomen.

Life cycle 
The females of this parasitic wasp lays its eggs by its long ovipositor on the body of larvae of solitary bees or wasps. On hatching its young larvae will devour grubs and supplies of pollen and nectar of its victim.

Habitat
Gasteruption jaculator has been found visiting various flowers, or hovering around the nests of solitary bees and wasps in gardens and meadows. The species is commonly found during May to September.

References

External links
 Biolib
 Fauna Europaea 
 Treknature
 Ponent at space
 Naturespot
  Los W. (ed.): Fauna Europaea

Evanioidea
Hymenoptera of Europe
Hymenoptera of Asia
Wasps described in 1758
Taxa named by Carl Linnaeus